The Madras Presidency Matches were annual first-class cricket matches played in Madras (now Chennai) from the 1915–16 season to 1951–52 between the cricket teams of Indians and the Europeans (i.e., Europeans who were living in India). The matches were played in the Chepauk Grounds (the present M. A. Chidambaram Stadium ) usually in mid-January around the time of Pongal festival. They were sometimes called the Pongal Matches because of this. Of the 33 matches played, Indians won 15 and the Europeans 8 with 10 draws.

Background
The Europeans v Indians matches were the idea of Buchi Babu Naidu of the Madras United Club (MUC) and Percival Partridge of the Madras Cricket Club (MCC). The MCC, at the time, was an exclusively white organisation and the MUC was founded by Buchi Babu as a similar cricket club for the Indians. Shortly before the first match Buchi Babu, who was to captain the Indian side, died of a heart attack. The match still went ahead, mainly because of the efforts of B.Subramaniam, an assistant of Buchi Babu. The Indian side was captained by BS Ramulu Naidu and the Europeans by Partridge. This "Presidency Hindus" and "Presidency Europeans" match was played between 29 December 1908 and 1 January 1909. It was abandoned because of rain without the first innings being completed.

Subramanian organised an annual Buchi Babu Memorial Tournament from 1909 and the Europeans v Indians series was not revived until the 1915–16 season. This match, which began on the last day of 1915, is considered as the first Madras Presidency match.

The matches
The Indian teams generally dominated the series and it was 1920 before Europeans scored their first victory. The length of the match was increased from two to three days in the third year and gates were introduced in 1921. The 1935 match was cancelled because of a dispute about sharing the profits from the previous year between the MCC and the Indian Cricket League.

The teams occasionally brought in players from outside the Madras Presidency. C. K. Nayudu, Maharajkumar of Vizianagram ,Krushna Chandra Gajapati and Phiroze Palia all played for the Indian team. In 1918 E. Britten-Jones, later to play a controversial role as the manager of the Indian cricket team in England in 1936, took the only hat-trick in the competition. In 1921, CK Nayudu hit 128 before lunch on the first day, an innings that included a famous hit. CK's hit cleared "the boundary wall at the southern end of the MCC compound – to land near a coconut tree 50 yards from the MCC grounds. The hit was easily above 150 yards from the batting crease". In 1927, Humphrey Ward of the Europeans hit 173 setting a record for the highest score in the series. It was bettered the next day by MC Sivasankaran who made 174 for the Indians.

Decline
The Second World War caused the cancellation of the 1942 match and from here the series went on a decline. By the late forties, with the exodus of the British, the Europeans struggled to raise their teams. As a consequence, the number of spectators saw a steady decrease. No match was played in 1949 and 1950 and those for 1951 and 1952 were two-day affairs. The match in the latter year was watched by a crowd of six people, four of whom were journalists. This was the last of the Madras Presidency matches.

An attempt was made in 1956 to revive the competition and a match was played between Indian and European members of the MCC. Indians won by an innings. This experiment was never repeated.

Statistics

Notes

References
 S Muthiah, The Spirit of Chepauk, East West Books (1998), 
 CricketArchive,Tournaments in India
 Indian Cricket 2004, Kasturi & Sons Ltd (Dec 2003)
 V Ramnarayan, Mosquitos and other Jolly Rovers, Kalamkriya Press (2002)

Indian domestic cricket competitions
Recurring events established in 1916
Recurring events disestablished in 1952